The Open Geospatial Consortium (OGC), an international voluntary consensus standards organization for geospatial content and location-based services, sensor web and Internet of Things, GIS data processing and data sharing. It originated in 1994 and involves more than 500 commercial, governmental, nonprofit and research organizations in a consensus process encouraging development and implementation of open standards.

History
A predecessor organization, OGF, the Open GRASS Foundation, started in 1992.

From 1994 to 2004 the organization also used the name Open GIS Consortium.

The OGC website gives a detailed history of the OGC.

Standards 
Most of the OGC standards depend on a generalized architecture captured in a set of documents collectively called the Abstract Specification, which describes a basic data model for representing geographic features. Atop the Abstract Specification members have developed and continue to develop a growing number of specifications, or standards to serve specific needs for interoperable location and geospatial technology, including GIS.

The OGC standards baseline comprises more than 30 standards, including:

 3D Tiles – Designed for streaming and rendering massive 3D geospatial content such as Photogrammetry, 3D Buildings, BIM/CAD, Instanced Features, and Point Clouds. 
CSW – Catalog Service for the Web: access to catalog information
GML – Geography Markup Language: XML-format for geographical information
GeoPackage – An open, standards-based, platform-independent, portable, self-describing, compact format for transferring geospatial information
GeoSPARQL – Geographic SPARQL Protocol and RDF Query Language: representation and querying of geospatial data for the Semantic Web
GeoXACML – Geospatial eXtensible Access Control Markup Language
KML – Keyhole Markup Language: XML-based language schema for expressing geographic annotation and visualization on existing (or future) Web-based, two-dimensional maps and three-dimensional Earth browsers
Observations and Measurements
OGC Reference Model – a complete set of reference models
OLS – Open Location Service (OpenLS)
OGC Web Services Context Document defines the application state of an OGC Integrated Client 
OWS – OGC Web Service Common
SOS – Sensor Observation Service
SPS – Sensor Planning Service
SensorML – Sensor Model Language
SensorThings API - an open and unified framework to interconnect IoT devices, data, and applications over the Web. Currently a candidate standard waiting for votes.
SFS – Simple Features – SQL
SLD - Styled Layer Descriptor
SRID, an identification for spatial coordinate systems 
WaterML – Information model for the representation of hydrological observation data
WCS – Web Coverage Service: provides access, subsetting, and processing on coverage objects
WCPS – Web Coverage Processing Service: provides a raster query language for ad-hoc processing and filtering on raster coverages
WFS – Web Feature Service: for retrieving or altering feature descriptions
WMS – Web Map Service: provides map images
WMTS – Web Map Tile Service: provides map image tiles
WPS – Web Processing Service: remote processing service
WTS – Web Terrain Service (WTS)

The design of standards were originally built on the HTTP web services paradigm for message-based interactions in web-based systems, but meanwhile has been extended with a common approach for SOAP protocol and WSDL bindings. Considerable progress has been made in defining Representational State Transfer (REST) web services, e.g., OGC SensorThings API.

Organization structure
The OGC has several operational units:

Standards program (SP)  
In the OGC Standards Program the Technical Committee and Planning Committee work in a formal consensus process to arrive at approved (or "adopted") OGC standards. Learn about the standards that have been approved so far, and see the lists of products that implement these standards.

Compliance Program (CP)  
The OGC Compliance Program provides the resources, procedures, and policies for improving software implementations' compliance with OGC standards. The Compliance Program provides an online free testing facility, a process for certification and branding of compliant products, and community coordination. 
The Compliance Program also runs plugfests, which are short term events for increasing interoperability among vendors' products.

Community and Outreach Program (COP)  
The OGC and its members offer resources to help technology developers and users take advantage of the OGC's open standards. Technical documents, training materials, test suites, reference implementations and other interoperability resources developed in OGC Interoperability Initiatives are available on our resources page. In addition, the OGC and its members support publications, workshops, seminars and conferences to help technology developers, integrators and procurement managers introduce OGC capabilities into their architectures.

Membership
The OGC offers membership options for industry, government, academic, research and not-for-profit organizations.

Collaboration
The OGC has a close relationship with ISO/TC 211 (Geographic Information/Geomatics). Volumes from the ISO 19100 series under development by this committee progressively replace the OGC abstract specification. Further, the OGC standards Web Map Service, GML, Web Feature Service, Observations and Measurements, and Simple Features Access have become ISO standards.

The OGC works with more than 20 international standards-bodies including W3C, OASIS, WfMC, and the IETF.

See also
GeoTools – implements OGC standards as OGC releases them
Open Source Geospatial Foundation (OSGeo)
List of geographic information systems software
Comparison of geographic information systems software
OpenLayers
Semantic Sensor Web
Weather Information Exchange Model

References

External links